Haplognathia is a genus of worms belonging to the family Haplognathiidae.

The species of this genus are found in Europe,  Northern Africa, Pacific Ocean.

Species:

Haplognathia asymmetrica 
Haplognathia belizensis 
Haplognathia filum 
Haplognathia gubbarnorum 
Haplognathia lunulifera 
Haplognathia rosea 
Haplognathia ruberrima 
Haplognathia rubromaculata 
Haplognathia rufa 
Haplognathia simplex

References

Gnathostomulida
Platyzoa genera